The Clark County School District (CCSD) is a school district that serves all of Clark County, Nevada, including the cities of Las Vegas, Henderson, North Las Vegas, and Boulder City; as well as the census-designated places of Laughlin, Blue Diamond, Logandale, Bunkerville, Goodsprings, Indian Springs, Mount Charleston, Moapa, Searchlight, and Sandy Valley. The district is divided into three regions and operates over 365 schools. The district has limited involvement with charter schools, and with the exception of providing some bus service, does not have any involvement with the private schools in the county. , the district is the fifth largest in the United States, serving over 320,000 students.

History
The Clark County School District began in 1956 when the Nevada Legislature mandated consolidation of all state school districts into 17 county school districts. This change meant that 14 separate school districts in Clark County would become part of the new Clark County School District.

R. Guild Gray, superintendent at the time of the former Clark County School District No. 2, stated before a Board of School Trustees meeting on February 1, 1956, that the district would be larger than political subdivision in the state of Nevada. Gray believed the district would be larger than the state highway department with 1,300 employees and an annual budget of $7,250,000.

Prior to 1956, each of the individual school districts in the county ran independent of each other, serving their respective cities and/or CDPs.

When the district began in 1956, enrollment was just over 20,000 and Clark County had about 103,000 residents. The district would continue to face challenges in the coming years. Funding was its biggest challenge and had been for many years as it contended with explosive population growth.

Growth
Due to the large number of families moving into the Las Vegas area, the school district saw tremendous growth in student enrollment from the 1990s through 2007. Several bond issues were approved by the voters to help the district deal with this growth. This has resulted in many new schools being constructed. In some years, as many as 16 schools have opened. 320,400 students were enrolled during the 2015–2016 school year.

This resulted in a very high demand for teachers to staff the classrooms. As a result, the district had to be creative in finding teachers to hire including recruiting of teachers from other states and other countries.

In 2008, the statewide recession impacted the district. In 2012, voters failed to pass a school construction bond. By 2014, the district was overwhelmed with new students as the economy recovered. Elementary schools were operating at 117.6% of planned capacity, with some schools at almost 200%. If a 2016 bond passes, officials hope new schools might be built by 2020.

Regions
Beginning in the 2019–2020 school year, CCSD schools were reorganized into three Regions. Each Region is led by a team of Region Leadership - one Region Superintendent and four School Associate Superintendents per Region.

Board of Trustees
The school district is governed by a seven-member board of trustees elected from sections of the county. The superintendent of schools is Dr. Jesús F. Jara who was appointed by the board in May 2018.  School board members serve staggered four year terms.

Current members of the Board of School Trustees are:
Evelyn Garcia Morales - President - District C
Lola Brooks - Vice President - District E
Irene Bustamante Adams - Clerk - District F
Linda P. Cavazos - District G
Brenda Zamora - District D
Lisa Guzmán - District A
Katie Williams - District B

Clark County School District superintendents 
R. Guild Gray, 1956-1961
Harvey N. Dondero (interim superintendent), 1961
Leland B. Newcomer, 1961-1965
James Mason, 1966-1969 
Kenny Guinn, 1969-1978
Claude G. Perkins, 1978-1981
Charles Silvestri (interim superintendent), 1981-1982
Robert E. Wentz, 1982-1989 
Brian Cram, 1989-2000
Carlos A. Garcia, 2000-2005
Walt Rulffes and Agustin Orci (interim co-superintendents), 2005-2006
Walt Rulffes, 2006-2010
Dwight D. Jones, 2010-2013
Pat Skorkowsky, 2013–2018
Jesús F. Jara, 2018–present

Transportation
Since the district operates in a valley that has had air quality concerns, it currently operates most of its bus fleet with a fuel mixture containing 20% biodiesel. Due to its location in the Mojave desert, there is not much native material that can be used to create biodiesel fuel, so the district partnered with Biodiesel Industries to use the grease from area restaurants as an additive. Due to tourism, the area generates twice the national average of 3 gallons of grease per resident per year, making this a reliable feed source for biodiesel fuel.

A student must register for school transportation when they register for school. A routing and scheduling program determines student transportation eligibility, assigns bus stops to eligible students, and notifies parents of the arrangements. It is not uncommon to expect older students, middle school and high school, to walk to and from school with distances up to three miles one way. For these students, air quality is a concern, as is heat. Temperatures at the beginning of the school year have been known to exceed 100 degrees Fahrenheit. It is suggested that students susceptible to health conditions related to heat and/or air-quality receive transportation to school.

School buildings

To reduce construction costs, most schools are being built to standard designs. These designs are adapted to the various sites to deal with different topographies and site sizes. While most elementary schools are single story buildings, the district has built some demonstration schools using two story plans so that smaller sites could be used allowing schools to be located in built up areas that do not have space for a traditional single story design. New school buildings after 2016 are using the two story designs.

Many middle schools built during the 1960s and 1980s were built in circular designs. An example of this design is the one story, 9-month middle school, B. Mahlon Brown Junior High School in Henderson. These schools are usually with one directional hallways with several different "wings" with each hosting different subjects (i.e., 100's Language Arts, 200's Mathematics, 300's Science).

During the 2010-2011 school, all schools converted to a 9-month school year due to budget shortfalls. Two campuses were converted back to year-round schedules beginning in the 2013–2014 school year. For the 2014–2015, 10 additional elementary school campuses were converted to the year-round schedule. This conversion was due entirely to overcrowding in these school buildings.

The district also adds portable classrooms, which are modular buildings, at many schools to provide additional space for classes.

The district had contracted with Edison Schools to operate several schools in an effort to improvement performance at those selected schools. The contract was terminated at the end of the 2013–2014 school year.

School police

See also 

 The Clark County School District Archive Committee documents the history of the CCSD. 
 List of the largest school districts in the United States by enrollment
 KLVX Communications Group owned by the school district; which operates KLVX (PBS member station known on-air as "Vegas PBS")

References

External links 
 

 
School districts in Nevada
Education in Clark County, Nevada
School districts established in 1956